Nathaniel Davis (1925–2011) was U.S. Assistant Secretary of State for African Affairs, 1975; U.S. Ambassador to Chile, 1971–1973.

Nathaniel Davis is also the name of:

 Nathaniel Penistone Davis (1895–1973), U.S. Ambassador to Costa Rica, 1948–1949, United States Ambassador to Hungary, 1949–1951
Nathaniel Newnham Davis (bishop) (1903–1966), bishop
Nathaniel Newnham-Davis (journalist) (1854–1917), lieutenant-colonel

See also
Nathan Davis (disambiguation)
Nate Davis (disambiguation)